George H. Conley (October 11, 1853 – December 20, 1905) was an American educator who served as superintendent of Lowell and Boston Public Schools.

Early life
Conley was born on October 11, 1853, in Lowell, Massachusetts. He attended Lowell Public Schools and graduated from the College of the Holy Cross in 1874. He studied for the priesthood at Saint-Sulpice Seminary in Montreal, but ill health forced him to return to Lowell and seek a less strenuous career, which led him to teaching.

Career
In 1876, Conley was appointed principal of the Horace Mann Grammar School in Lowell. He was transferred to the Butler School when it opened in 1883. On April 10, 1884, he was elected superintendent of schools. In 1886 he resigned to become a supervisor of schools in Boston. In 1893 he was appointed to the Massachusetts Board of Education. On July 12, 1904, he was elected superintendent of schools. On the morning of December 20, 1905, Conley, who had been in poor health, died at his home in Brookline, Massachusetts.

References

1853 births
1905 deaths
19th-century American educators
20th-century American educators
Boston Public Schools superintendents
Catholics from Massachusetts
College of the Holy Cross alumni
Educators from Massachusetts
People from Brookline, Massachusetts
People from Lowell, Massachusetts